Nothing but the Water is Grace Potter and the Nocturnals' first studio album. It was released on May 10, 2005 independently by the band.  The album was re-released with re-mastered tracks and a bonus DVD on May 23, 2006 after the band signed with Hollywood Records in late 2005.

Reception

The album was positively received on Allmusic.

Track listing
All tracks are written by Grace Potter, except where noted.
 "Toothbrush and My Table" (Potter, Matt Burr) - 4:31    
 "Some Kind of Ride" - 3:40   
 "Ragged Company" - 4:59
 "Left Behind" (Potter, Burr, Bryan Dondero, Scott Tournet) - 3:39
 "Treat Me Right" (Potter, Burr, Dondero, Tournet) - 4:27
 "Sweet Hands" - 3:37
 "Joey" (Potter, Burr, Dondero, Tournet) - 5:17
 "2:22" (Potter, Tournet) - 4:32
 "All but One" - 4:53
 "Below the Beams" (Potter, Burr, Dondero, Tournet) - 1:33
 "Nothing but the Water (I)" - 2:44
 "Nothing but the Water (II)" - 5:16

Personnel
Adapted from AllMusic and the booklet.

The Nocturnals
Grace Potter - lead vocals, keyboards, Hammond organ, tambourine
Scott Tournett - acoustic, electric & resonator guitars, backing vocals
Bryan Dondero - bass guitar, upright bass
Matt Burr - drums, percussion, trash cans

Additional personnel
Jennifer Crowell - tambourine and backing vocals (Tracks 7, 11 and 12)

References

External links

2005 debut albums
Hollywood Records albums
Grace Potter and the Nocturnals albums